Conrad Indianapolis is a high-rise luxury hotel in Indianapolis, Indiana. It was completed in 2006 and has 23 floors. The building includes street-level retail, 247 hotel rooms, and 18 residential condominiums. Conrad Hotels is one of the luxury brands of Hilton Hotels & Resorts, and Conrad Indianapolis is one of six Conrad Hotels in the United States, the other five being located in Chicago, Miami, New York City, and Washington, DC. In 2007 and 2008, Conde Nast Traveler ranked Conrad Indianapolis in the top 100 in the world and Expedia Insiders’ 2009 Select list of the world's best hotels named Conrad as number one in the United States.

The Conrad Indianapolis is connected to the downtown skywalk system via the Indianapolis Artsgarden.

According to the Indianapolis Business Journal, the Conrad Indianapolis has 150 full-time employees and was last renovated in 2015. As of 2020, one dining option was located in the hotel, The Capital Grille.

See also
List of tallest buildings in Indianapolis
List of tallest buildings in Indiana

References

External links

Conrad Indianapolis at Skyscraper Page
Conrad Indianapolis at Emporis

Skyscraper hotels in Indianapolis
2006 establishments in Indiana
Hilton Hotels & Resorts hotels
Hotel buildings completed in 2006
Hotels established in 2006